Pablo Carreño Busta and Pablo Cuevas were the defending champions, but withdrew before the tournament began.

David Marrero and Fernando Verdasco won the title, defeating Nikola Mektić and Alexander Peya in the final, 5–7, 7–5, [10–8]. Marrero and Verdasco were the first lucky loser team to win an ATP World Tour doubles title since 2014.

Seeds

Draw

Draw

Qualifying

Seeds

Qualifiers
  Nicolás Jarry /  Jiří Veselý

Lucky losers
  David Marrero /  Fernando Verdasco

Qualifying draw

References

External links
 Main draw
 Qualifying draw

Rio Open - Doubles
Rio
Rio Open